Montbello High School was a high school located in Denver, Colorado, United States in the Denver Public Schools system. It was located in the Montbello neighborhood on the northeast side of Denver. The school opened in fall 1980, the first graduating class being the class of 1981. The school's final class graduated in 2014. In 2020 the Denver Public Schools Board of Education committed to re-opening Montbello High School at its current campus, as well as creating a new feeder middle school. Both schools will open in the 2022–2023 school year. The Board formalized the next steps for unifying the existing school communities to reimagine them as a large comprehensive Montbello High School.

Demographics
Enrolled in the 2009–2010 school year were 1,686 students. The student body's racial demographics were:

6% Caucasian
30.7% African American
60.9% Latino  Swerve
0.4% Native American
2% Asian

Using federal government guidelines, 84.46% of the students were eligible for free or reduced-price lunches.

References

High schools in Denver
Public high schools in Colorado